Bedingfeld, a variant of Bedingfield, is an English surname. Notable people with this surname include the following:

 Anthony Bedingfield (died 1651), English merchant and politician
 Daniel Bedingfield (born 1979), New Zealand musician
 Edmund Bedingfield (1479–1553), English knight
 Eric Bedingfield (born 1967), American politician
 Frances Bedingfeld (1616–1704), Mother Superior of the English Institute of Mary
 Frank Bedingfield (1877–1904), English footballer
 Gary Bedingfield (born 1963), British baseball historian
 Glenn Bedingfield (born 1974), Maltese journalist
 Henry Bedingfield, multiple people including:
 Henry Bedingfeld (1509–1583), eldest son of Edmund Bedingfeld (1479–1553)
 Henry Bedingfield (1632–1687), English judge and politician
 Henry Paston-Bedingfeld (born 1943), officer of arms at the College of Arms in London, England
 Natasha Bedingfield (born 1981), British singer/songwriter
 Nikola Rachelle Bedingfield (born 1986), British singer/songwriter
 Philip Bedingfield (died 1660), English politician
 Thomas Bedingfield, multiple people including:
 Thomas Bedingfield (died 1613), English translator
 Thomas Bedingfield (1554–1636), English politician
 Thomas Bedingfield (1592–1661), English judge and politician
Kate Bedingfield, deputy campaign manager for the Joe Biden 2020 presidential campaign

See also
Paston-Bedingfeld Baronets of Oxburgh in the County of Norfolk, a title in the Baronetage of England

English-language surnames